Düring is a surname. Notable people with the name include:

Christian Düring (born 1939), German former sports shooter
Jan Erik Düring (1926–2014), Norwegian film director
Niclas Düring (born 1990), Swedish sailor
Ingemar Düring (1903–1984), Swedish classical philologist
Svend von Düring (1915–1969), Norwegian actor

See also
Eugen Dühring (1833-1921), German economist and philosopher